The 1965 Moscow Victory Day Parade was held on 9 May 1965 to commemorate the 20th anniversary of the capitulation of Nazi Germany in 1945. The parade marks the Soviet Union's victory in the Great Patriotic War.

Prior to 1965 Victory Day was not a major holiday and parades were not held, with the exception of the 1945 Victory Day Parade. The Victory Parade of 1965 was the second made after 1945 Victory Day Parade. After this parade next would be held recently in 1985. It also coincided with the first Victory Day Parades to be held in Soviet cities all over the country, with parades being held for the first time in cities such as Vladivostok and Kishinev.

Events 
The parade was observed by Soviet leaders from Lenin's Mausoleum. Major political figures attending were General Secretary of the Communist Party Leonid Brezhnev, Chairman of the Council of Ministers Alexei Kosygin, and Minister of Defence Marshal Rodion Malinovsky among other leaders in the Soviet government. 12 delegations from socialist nations such as the People's Republic of Bulgaria, Cuba, and Vietnam attended the parade, with the dignitaries including East German Prime Minister Willi Stoph, Algerian politburo member Houari Boumédiène and Communist Party of Spain Chairman Dolores Ibarruri. The parade was commanded by Moscow Military District Commander General of the Army Afanasy Beloborodov. It was on that very parade that Mikhail Yegorov and Meliton Kantaria, the then two surviving raisers of the Victory Banner, escorted it as the color party of the banner marched past the dignitaries on Red Square with retired Col. Konstantin Samsonov carrying the banner.

On this parade what is now the 1st Honor Guard Company of the 154th Preobrazhensky Independent Commandant's Regiment made its parade debut. Several of the then living officers from the war bearing the rank of Marshal of the Soviet Union, including Georgy Zhukov, the parade inspector of the original 1945 Victory Parade, attended the event.

Full order of the 1965 parade 
Following the limousine carrying General of the Army Beloborodov, the parade march past in the following manner:

Military bands 
 Massed Military Bands of the Moscow Military District

Ground column 
 Victory Banner Color Guard
 Honor Guard Company
 Corps of Drums of the Moscow Military Music College
 V. I. Lenin Military Political Academy
 Military Artillery Academy "Felix Dzerzhinsky"
 Military Armored Forces Academy
 Military Engineering Academy
 Military Academy of Chemical Defense and Control
 Yuri Gagarin Air Force Academy
 Zhukovsky Air Force Engineering Academy
 Moscow Military High Command Training School "Supreme Soviet of the Russian SFSR"
 Moscow Border Guards Institute of the Border Defence Forces of the KGB "Moscow City Council"
 OMSDON Ind. Motorized Division of the Internal Troops of the Ministry of Internal Affairs of the USSR "Felix Dzerzhinsky"
 Suvorov Military School
 Nakhimov Naval School

Almost a third of the parade participants were veterans of the war.

External links

References

Moscow Victory Day Parades
1965 in the Soviet Union
1965 in military history
May 1965 events in Europe